Inez Jasper (née Point), also known as Inez, (born May 19, 1981) is a Canadian musician, whose music blends pop, dance, hip hop and traditional First Nations music.

She is most noted as a two-time nominee for the Juno Award for Aboriginal Album of the Year, in 2010 for her album Singsoulgirl and in 2014 for her album Burn Me Down.

Biography

Inez Jasper was born and raised in Chilliwack, British Columbia. She is of Sto:lo, Ojibway and Métis heritage. She is the daughter of Mark Point, a former Skowkale First Nation chief, and the niece of Steven Point, a former Lieutenant Governor of British Columbia.

She was educated as a registered nurse, and works as a community health nurse for Stó:lō Nation Health Services. She has two children, and in 2010 her husband Otis Jasper served as the chief of Soowahlie First Nation.

She released her debut single "Sto:lo Strong" in 2005, before releasing the full-length album SingSoulGirl in January 2009. She toured extensively to support the album, and won awards at both the Aboriginal Peoples Choice Music Awards and the Western Canadian Music Awards. At the APCMAs, "Breathe" won Single of the Year, SingSoulGirl won Pop Album of the Year, and Jasper won Best New Artist.

She subsequently released two non-album singles, "Make U Mine" in 2011 and "Dancin' on the Run" in 2013, before releasing her second album Burn Me Down in August 2013. The album again won the award for Pop Album of the Year at the APCMAs, and was again a Juno Award nominee for Aboriginal Album of the Year. Jasper was also named Best Producer/Engineer at the APCMAs in 2014.

She was named a National Aboriginal Role Model by the National Aboriginal Health Organization in 2008.

Discography

Studio albums

Singles

Guest appearances

Awards and nominations

See also

First Nations music
Music of Canada
Canadian hip hop

References

External links

1981 births
Living people
21st-century Canadian women singers
21st-century First Nations people
Canadian women pop singers
Canadian women singer-songwriters
Canadian singer-songwriters
Canadian pop singers
First Nations musicians
Musicians from British Columbia
People from Chilliwack
Sto:lo people
First Nations women